The 2011–12 DFB-Pokal, the 62nd season of Germany's premier football cup competition, came to a close on 12 May 2012 when Borussia Dortmund played against Bayern Munich at the Olympiastadion in Berlin.

Borussia Dortmund won 5–2, their third DFB-Pokal triumph and the completion of their first Bundesliga and DFB-Pokal double.

Route to the final
The DFB-Pokal began with 64 teams in a single-elimination knockout cup competition. There were a total of five rounds leading up to the final. Teams were drawn against each other, and the winner after 90 minutes would advance. If still tied, 30 minutes of extra time was played. If the score was still level, a penalty shoot-out was used to determine the winner.

Note: In all results below, the score of the finalist is given first (H: home; A: away).

Match

Details

References

External links
 
 Match report at kicker.de 
 Match report at WorldFootball.net
 Match report at Fussballdaten.de 

2012
2011–12 in German football cups
Borussia Dortmund matches
FC Bayern Munich matches
May 2012 sports events in Europe
Football competitions in Berlin
2012 in Berlin